Isn't It Delicious is a 2013 American comedy-drama film starring Kathleen Chalfant and Keir Dullea.

Plot
When Joan Weldon discovers she is dying of lung cancer, she sets out to reconcile her dysfunctional relationships with her three children, her husband, and along the way, her former best friend. The family's destructive ways are offset by messy and somewhat humorous attempts by Joan to set her children on the right course before she dies. In this big dysfunctional mix, they will all learn to connect in their own ways, and realize on their own terms what life is about.

Cast
Kathleen Chalfant as Joan Weldon
Keir Dullea as Bill Weldon
Alice Ripley as Caroline Weldon
Mia Dillon as Molly
Malachy McCourt as Father Bob
Robert LuPone as Sam Spenser
Nick Stevenson as Bobby Weldon
Jonah Young as Teddy Weldon
Alexandra Mingione as Robin

Reception
The film has a 40% rating on Rotten Tomatoes.

References

External links
 
 

American comedy-drama films
2013 comedy-drama films
2013 films
Films scored by David Amram
2010s English-language films
2010s American films